The least of the great powers is a label used to conceptualize Italy's international status. This concept originated with the unification of the country in the late 19th century, when Italy was admitted in the concert of powers. Nowadays, Italy is also part of great power concerts such as the EU trio, the NATO Quint, the G7 and various International Contact Groups. Italy is also one of the UN's and the EU's major funders, the leading nation of the Uniting for Consensus, and serves as one of the states of "chief" importance in providing shipping services, air transport, and industrial development. Alternative terms used by academics and observers to describe this concept include "intermittent major power" and "small great power".

Strengths and weaknesses
Italy's great power strength includes a vast advanced economy (in terms of national wealth, net wealth per capita and national GDP), a strong manufacturing industry (ranking 7th on the list of countries by manufacturing output), a large luxury goods market, a large national budget and the third largest gold reserve in the world. It has one of the largest SDRs and Voting Power in the IMF. The country is a cultural superpower and it has close ties with the rest of the Catholic world as the home of the Pope. Italy is a key player in maintaining international security, especially in the wider Mediterranean region, by performing air policing duties for its allies and commanding multinational forces in foreign countries. The country has therefore developed considerable military capabilities by building two aircraft carriers and establishing some overseas military bases. The Italian navy was the first to launch an intermediate-range ballistic missile from the sea, an UGM-27 Polaris launched from the cruiser Giuseppe Garibaldi. The country is home to two nuclear bases and, as part of the NATO nuclear sharing program, therefore has a retaliatory nuclear capacity despite nominally being a non-nuclear state. According to the former Italian President Francesco Cossiga, Italy's plans of nuclear retaliation during the Cold War consisted of targeting nuclear weapons in Czechoslovakia and Hungary in case the Soviet Union waged nuclear war against NATO. He acknowledged the presence of U.S. nuclear weapons in Italy, and speculated about the possible presence of British and French nuclear weapons.
Italy secretly developed its own nuclear weapons program, and one in collaboration with France and Germany, but abandoned such projects when it joined the nuclear sharing program. The country has developed the ABM PAAMS system. It has developed several space-launch vehicles such as Alfa and more recently Vega. In more recent years, under the auspices of European space agency, it has demonstrated the reentry and landing of a spacecraft, the Intermediate eXperimental Vehicle. Italy is home of one of two ground operations centres of the Galileo global satellite navigation system.

Italy contributes greatly to scientific research and operates some permanent research stations in Antarctica. In terms of spaceflight capability, the country owns the Broglio Space Centre. The country is a major contributor to the European Space Agency and the International Space Station.

Italy's weakness and structural problems include: internal political instability, a large public debt, a diminishing economic productivity, low economic growth, especially in the last ten years, and a significant Centre-North/South socio-economic divide.

Overview

Following the Risorgimento, the newly united Italy was recognized as the "sixth great power" by Austria, Prussia, France, Russia and the British Empire. Italians achieved unification and independence from Austria and the House of Bourbon, securing national unification in 1861. The papacy called France to resist unification, fearing that giving up control of the Papal States would weaken the Church and allow the liberals to dominate conservative Catholics. Italy captured Rome in 1870 and later formed the Triple Alliance with Germany and Austria. In the same year, the coastal town of Assab on the Red Sea was taken over by the Italian government, becoming Italy's first overseas territory.

Italy defeated the Ottoman Empire in 1911–1912. By 1914, Italy had acquired Eritrea, a large protectorate in Somalia and administrative authority in formerly Turkish Libya. Outside of Africa, Italy possessed a small concession in Tientsin in China (following the intervention of the Eight-Nation Alliance in the Boxer Rebellion) and the Dodecanese Islands off the coast of Turkey.

Austria took the offensive against the terms of the alliance and Italy decided to take part in World War I as a principal allied power with France, the UK and Japan. During the First World War, Italy occupied southern Albania to prevent it from falling to Austria-Hungary. In 1917, it established a protectorate over Albania, which remained in place until 1920. Italy defeated the Austrian Empire at Vittorio Veneto in 1918 and became one of the permanent members of the League of Nations' executive council.

The Fascist government that came to power with Benito Mussolini in 1922 sought to increase the size of the Italian empire and to satisfy the claims of Italian irredentists. In 1935–36, in its second invasion of Ethiopia Italy was successful and merged its new conquest with its older east African colonies. In 1939, Italy invaded Albania and incorporated it into the Fascist state. During the Second World War (1939–45), Italy formed the axis alliance with Japan and Germany and occupied several territories (such as parts of France, Greece, Egypt and Tunisia) but was forced in the final peace to abandon all of its protectorates.

Following the civil war and the economic depression caused by World War II, Italy enjoyed an economic miracle, promoted European unity, joined NATO and became an active member of the European Union. Italy was granted a United Nations trust to administer Somaliland in 1950. When Somalia became independent in 1960, Italy's eight-decade experience with colonialism ended.

For most of the second half of the 20th century the Christian Democrats dominated the Italian political landscape pursuing a foreign policy aimed at strengthening East–West dialogue. As a consequence of that, Italy decided to build close relations with the Arab world and the USSR despite being part of the free world.

In 1962, Prime Minister Amintore Fanfani favored the compromise between the US and the Soviet Union during the Cuban Missile Crisis by removing the Jupiter ballistic missiles from Italian soil. In the 70s
Foreign minister Aldo Moro signed a secret pact (known as the Lodo Moro) with the PLO, reversing the special status given to the Mossad of Israel by Alcide De Gasperi (the so-called Lodo De Gasperi).

In the 80s, under the leadership of the socialist Bettino Craxi, Italy acted as an aggressive regional power in the Mediterranean. Craxi warned Gaddafi of the 1986 United States bombing of Libya, allowing him to survive the attack, and ordered the Italian intelligence services to plan a coup d'état in Tunisia supporting the installment of Ben Ali as the new president of the country.

Giulio Andreotti was the last Christian democrat to serve as Prime Minister between 1989 and 1992. Despite being hostile to German reunification, he became one of the fathers of the Maastricht Treaty along with German Chancellor Helmut Kohl and French President François Mitterrand, often in contrast with Margaret Thatcher.

See also
Great Power
Power (international relations)

Notes

References

19th-century establishments in Italy
Modern history of Italy
Power (international relations)